Kati Rekai,  (October 20, 1921 – February 1, 2010) was a Hungarian-Canadian writer/broadcaster, author of a series of travel books for children: "The Adventures of Mickey, Taggy, Puppo, and Cica and How They Discover Toronto, The Gardiner Museum of Ceramic Art, Toronto 200, Ottawa, Montreal, Kingston, Brockville and the Thousand Islands, British Columbia Budapest, Vienna, The Netherlands, France, Italy, Switzerland, and Greece", published in English French, Polish, Romanian, Hungarian, Chinese and Braille.

Puppet shows based on Mickey, Taggy, Puppo and Cica: "The Great Totem Pole Caper", "The Tale of Tutenkhamen" and "The Boy Who Forgot".

Organization
Organizations with which Rekai was associated were:

 CANSCAIP
 Canadian Opera Company
 George R. Gardiner Museum of Ceramic Art
 Canada-Hungary Educational Foundation
 Friends of Toronto Public Libraries

Positions
Rekai was also the weekly cultural commentator for "The Hungarian Show" on the Toronto-based broadcasting station CIAO Radio530AM, and a columnist for Kaleidoscope Magazine.  Some of the other positions that Rekai held as a contributor to the literary arts include:

Arts Commentator, CHIN Radio
Contributor/Director,Performing Arts & Entertainment Magazine
Literary Workshops in Schools
Chair, Foreign Affairs Committee, The Writers' Union of Canada
Vice-President, Canadian Ethnic Media Association
Director,Toronto International Exchange Foundation
Director, Canadian Scene Multi-language News Service
Director, Hungarian-Canadian Chamber of Commerce
Director, CREES, University of Toronto
Director, Toronto Operetta Theatre
Cultural Columnist, Kanadai/Amerikai Magyarsag

The Writers' Union of Canada

Rekai was granted life membership in the Writers' Union of Canada "in recognition of her exceptional contributions to the advancement of the works of Canadian writers on the world stage".

As Chair of its Foreign Affairs Committee, developed and organized 20 "Canadian Book Exhibitions Abroad" for the Writers' Union of Canada in: Budapest, Hungary; Galatz,Romania; Prague, Czechoslovakia; Berlin,East Germany; Riga,Latvia; Tokyo,Japan; Athens,Greece; New York City; Belfast, Northern Ireland; Ljubljana, Slovenia; Kiev, Ukraine; Lanzhou,People's Republic of China; Sofia, Bulgaria; Tirana,Albania; Havana,Cuba; Manila,The Philippines; St.Petersburg,Russia; Cape Town, South Africa; Colombo, Sri Lanka.

Awards
Rekai received a number of awards in recognition of her achievements including:

Prix Saint-Exupery, Francophonie Valeurs-Jeunesse(Paris)
Knighthood of St.Ladislaus
Certificate of Honour for Contribution to Canadian Unity
Rakoczi Foundation Award for the Preservation of the Historical and Cultural Heritage of the Magyars
Cross of the Order of Merit of the Republic of Hungary for Contribution to the Development of Canadian-Hungarian Cultural Relations
Sierhey Khamara Ziniak Award for Excellence in Journalism

Appointed to the Order of Canada in 1993 with the following citation: "Has written travel books for children that introduce and promote Canadian cities and European countries through the eyes of four animals, Mickey, Taggy, Puppo and Cica, each of which represents a part of the Canadian mosaic; the books educate children and adults about music, literature, pioneering and native peoples".

External links
 The Writers' Union of Canada profile
 Kati Rekai fonds at the University of Calgary
  a MoviTV / CNN story on Kati Rekai's work
 March 2, 2010 obituary in The Globe and Mail (Toronto)

1921 births
2010 deaths
Canadian children's writers
Hungarian emigrants to Canada
Members of the Order of Canada
Recipients of the Order of Merit of the Republic of Hungary
Hungarian women writers
Canadian women children's writers